Green Spring Branch is a  long 2nd order tributary to Duck Creek in New Castle County, Delaware.

Course
Green Spring Branch rises on the Sawmill Branch divide about 1 mile northeast of Green Spring, Delaware.

Watershed
Green Spring Branch drains  of area, receives about 44.3 in/year of precipitation, has a topographic wetness index of 605.67 and is about 4.9% forested.

See also
List of rivers of Delaware

References 

Rivers of Delaware
Rivers of New Castle County, Delaware
Tributaries of the Smyrna River